Inotrechus is a genus of beetles in the family Carabidae, containing the following species:

 Inotrechus injaevae Daizhanski & Ljovuschkin, 1989
 Inotrechus kurnakovi Dolzhanski & Ljovuschkin, 1989

References

Trechinae